Psephochelys  (meaning "pebbly turtle") is an extinct genus of placodont reptile from the Late Triassic of China. It is represented by a single species, Psephochelys polyosteoderma, named in 2002 on the basis of a single partial skeleton found in an outcrop of the Carnian-age Falong Formation in Guizhou Province. Psephochelys is classified as a member of the family Placochelyidae, which is within the larger placodont superfamily Cyamodontoidea. Like other cyamodontoids, Psephochelys has a wide shell covering its body, similar to that of a turtle. However, unlike those of other cyamodontoids, the shell of Psephochelys only covers its back. The plastron, which covers the underside of other cyamodontoids, is absent, and in its place are rib-like gastralia surrounded by loosely connecting osteoderms or bony plates.

References

Placodonts
Prehistoric animals of China
Sauropterygian genera